Six Dynasties (220–589 or 222–589) is a collective term for six Han Chinese-ruled Chinese dynasties that existed from the early 3rd century AD to the late 6th century AD, between the end of the Han Dynasty and beginning of the Sui Dynasty. The Six Dynasties period overlapped with the era of the Sixteen Kingdoms, a chaotic warring period in northern China after the collapse of the Western Jin dynasty. The term "Wei, Jin, Southern and Northern Dynasties" (魏晋南北朝 [zh] ) is also used by Chinese historians when referring to the historical period of the Six Dynasties, although both terms do not refer to the exact same dynasties.

Six Dynasties with capitals in Jiankang
The six dynasties based in Jiankang (in modern Nanjing) were:

 Eastern Wu dynasty (222–280)
 Eastern Jin dynasty (317–420)
 Liu Song dynasty (420–479)
 Southern Qi dynasty (479–502)
 Liang dynasty (502–557)
 Chen dynasty (557–589)

Xu Song (許嵩) from the Tang dynasty wrote a book titled Veritable Records of Jiankang (建康實錄) that provides a historical account of Jiankang, which gave rise to this list.

Poetry in the Six Dynasties

The Six Dynasties was an important era in the history of Chinese poetry, especially remarkable for its frank (for Classical Chinese poetry) descriptions of love and beauty. Especially important, and frequently translated into English, is the anthology New Songs from the Jade Terrace, compiled by Xu Ling (507–83), under the patronage of Crown Prince Xiao Gang (Later Emperor Jian Wen) of the Liang dynasty. Also significant, is the Zi Ye, or "Lady Midnight" style, supposedly originating with an eponymously named fourth-century professional singer of the Jin dynasty.

Legacy

As the first time in history that political centre of China was located in the south, with surge in population and continual development of economy and culture, this transformed southern China from being remote territories to the economic centre that can rival the north from Tang dynasty onwards.

Buddhism, which first reached China via the Silk Road during the Eastern Han dynasty. Buddhism flourished in the Six Dynasties (and simultaneously in the Northern Dynasties) and has been a major religion in China ever since.

The Japanese scholar Tanigawa Michio analysed the Six Dynasties period to test general theories of China's historical development. Some thinkers, Tanigawa writes, argue that China followed the set European pattern which Marxists and liberal thinkers thought to be universal, that is, from ancient slavery to medieval feudalism to modern capitalism, while others argue that "Chinese society was extraordinarily saturated with stagnancy, as compared to the West, and they assume that it existed in a qualitatively different historical world from Western society." That is, there an argument between those who see "uni-linear, monistic world history" and those who conceive of a "two-tracked or multitracked world history." Tanigawa's conclusion is that China did not have "feudalism" in the sense that Marxists use, but that the military governments did not develop a military aristocracy of the sort that developed in Europe. The period established social and political patterns which shaped China's history from that point on.

See also
 Chinese sovereign
 Dynasties in Chinese history
 History of China
 Nanjing (Nanking)
 Northern Dynasties
 Southern Dynasties

References

Citations

Sources 

 
 
 Watson, Burton (1971).  Chinese Lyricism:  Shih Poetry from the Second to the Twelfth Century. New York: Columbia University Press. 
 SIX DYNASTIES CIVILIZATION

External links
 Intellectual Trends Of The Early Six Dynasties Period Indiana University.  
 Ch 1 The Six Dynasties Dien, Six Dynasties Civilization.
 300 to 600 CE: CHINA Asia for Educators Columbia University Weatherhead Institute. Documents, maps, links.

Dynasties in Chinese history
Former countries in Chinese history
History of Nanjing